Souira Guedima, formerly known as Aguz, is a Moroccan town 36 km south of Safi, at the mouth of the Tensift River on the Atlantic seacoast. Guedima may also be spelt Kadima, Kdima, Qadima (best English transliteration), or Qdima. Aguz may also be spelt Agouz, Gouz or Couz.

History
The town was an important port in the 11th century, serving the city of Aghmat which was inland 3 days journey to the east.

Portuguese fortress
Between 1506 and 1525 the stronghold of Aguz was an enclave under Portuguese colonial rule, as were various other Moroccan towns, such as Safim (Safi) (1488–1541) .

It was governed by the following Portuguese Captains :
1506-1507 - Diogo de Azambuja
 (at least one anonymous)
15..-1525 - Gonçalo Mendes Sacoto

The fort

Notes

Sources
WorldStatesmen- Morocco

External links
Moroccan Government document on the Safi area (in French)

Former Portuguese colonies
Kingdom of the Algarve
Populated places in Safi Province
1506 establishments in the Portuguese Empire
1525 disestablishments in the Portuguese Empire

Forts in Morocco